Kang Min-woo (born 26 March 1987) is a South Korean former footballer.

Career statistics

Club

Notes

References

1987 births
Living people
Dongguk University alumni
South Korean footballers
South Korean expatriate footballers
Association football defenders
K League 1 players
Campeonato de Portugal (league) players
K3 League (2007–2019) players
Gangwon FC players
Gimcheon Sangmu FC players
Vitória F.C. players
Sertanense F.C. players
South Korean expatriate sportspeople in Portugal
Expatriate footballers in Portugal